Louis Ozawa Changchien (born October 11, 1975) is an American actor best known for his role in the films Predators (2010) and The Bourne Legacy (2012).

Early life and education
Changchien was born in Queens, New York and raised in New York City and Japan, the son of a Japanese mother, a jewelry designer, and a Taiwanese father. He attended Riverdale Country School as well as Stuyvesant High School and Brown University, where he holds an MFA in acting.

Career
Changchien first appeared in the 1999 film On the Q.T. as Kenneth. Since then, he has appeared in many popular films, including Robot Stories, Fair Game, Predators and The Bourne Legacy. He also has made guest appearances on such shows as, Law & Order, 3 lbs., Heroes and Villains, Lights Out and Blue Bloods.

Filmography

Film

Television

Voice work

Video games

Bibliography
 Maberry, Jonathan and Ozawa, Louis (2022). Aliens vs. Predators: Ultimate Prey. Titan Books.

See also

List of Japanese Americans
List of Taiwanese Americans

References

External links

American male film actors
American male television actors
American male stage actors
American male actors of Taiwanese descent
American film actors of Asian descent
Stuyvesant High School alumni
Brown University alumni
Living people
1975 births
American male actors of Japanese descent
Male actors from New York City
Riverdale Country School alumni